Wat Florida Dhammaram is a Buddhist monastery in Kissimmee, Florida, established by Lung-po Chaokhun Phra Tepvaraporn (Im Arindhamo) in the mid-1990s.

History
Lung-po visited lay-devotees in Florida and perceived the lack of a Buddhist monastery in the Central Florida area. After gaining approval from the late abbot of Wat Sommanat Vihara, Chaokhun Somdej Phra Wannarat Chop Thitadhammamahathera, he began fund raising in Thailand. In 1993, three monks were sent with Prakrupalad Sunnan (now Chaokhun Phra Vijitrdhammapani, the present abbot) to establish and further the development of Wat Florida Dhammaram.

External links 
 Wat Florida Dhammaram's Website

Asian-American culture in Florida
Buddhism in Florida
Buddhist monasteries in the United States
Thai-American culture
Thai Theravada Buddhist temples and monasteries
Buildings and structures in Kissimmee, Florida
Overseas Thai Buddhist temples
Buddhist temples in Florida
1990s establishments in Florida